Upi Darmayana Tamin (born 4 February 1970) is an Indonesian chess player. She was awarded the title of Woman International Master by FIDE in 1985. Tamin won the Asian women's championship of 1996 in Salem, Tamil Nadu, India. In 2002, she won the Anniswati Memorial Cup 1st Leg held in Jakarta. 

At the 2005 Southeast Asian Games, she won a bronze medal with the Indonesian team, which finished third in the women's standard team event. Tamin also represented Indonesia at the Women's Chess Olympiad five times, in 1986, 1988, 1994, 1996 and 2000.

References

External links

Upi Darmayana Tamin chess games at 365Chess.com

1970 births
Living people
Chess Woman International Masters
Indonesian female chess players
Chess Olympiad competitors
Sportspeople from Jakarta
Southeast Asian Games bronze medalists for Indonesia
Southeast Asian Games medalists in chess
Competitors at the 2005 Southeast Asian Games
20th-century Indonesian women
21st-century Indonesian women